Tubulipora is a genus of bryozoans belonging to the family Tubuliporidae.

The genus has cosmopolitan distribution.

Species:

Tubulipora admiranda 
Tubulipora aliciae 
Tubulipora alternata 
Tubulipora anderssoni 
Tubulipora anhaltina 
Tubulipora aperta 
Tubulipora biduplicata 
Tubulipora biserialis 
Tubulipora bocki 
Tubulipora borgi 
Tubulipora brasiliensis 
Tubulipora capitata 
Tubulipora carinata 
Tubulipora chilensis 
Tubulipora clavata 
Tubulipora confracta 
Tubulipora congesta 
Tubulipora connata 
Tubulipora continua 
Tubulipora crates 
Tubulipora cumulus 
Tubulipora dichotoma 
Tubulipora dimidiata 
Tubulipora disposita 
Tubulipora disticha 
Tubulipora druidica 
Tubulipora duplicatocrenata 
Tubulipora egregia 
Tubulipora eminens 
Tubulipora euroa 
Tubulipora expansa 
Tubulipora falunica 
Tubulipora fasciculifera 
Tubulipora fimbria 
Tubulipora flabellaris 
Tubulipora floriformis 
Tubulipora foliacea 
Tubulipora foraminulata 
Tubulipora fructuosa 
Tubulipora fruticosa 
Tubulipora gambierensis 
Tubulipora glomerata 
Tubulipora gracillima 
Tubulipora gregaria 
Tubulipora hemiphragmata 
Tubulipora hirsuta 
Tubulipora ingens 
Tubulipora interrupta 
Tubulipora labiata 
Tubulipora lecointreae 
Tubulipora liliacea 
Tubulipora lobifera 
Tubulipora lobulata 
Tubulipora lucida 
Tubulipora lunata 
Tubulipora macella 
Tubulipora margaritacea 
Tubulipora marisalbi 
Tubulipora meneghini 
Tubulipora midwayanica 
Tubulipora minuta 
Tubulipora minuta 
Tubulipora miocenica 
Tubulipora misakiensis 
Tubulipora mitis 
Tubulipora murmanica 
Tubulipora mutsu 
Tubulipora nevianii 
Tubulipora nordgaardi 
Tubulipora notomala 
Tubulipora orbiculus 
Tubulipora organisans 
Tubulipora pacifica 
Tubulipora parvus 
Tubulipora patula 
Tubulipora perforata 
Tubulipora perfragilis 
Tubulipora phalangea 
Tubulipora plumosa 
Tubulipora proteica 
Tubulipora pulchra 
Tubulipora pyriformis 
Tubulipora radiata 
Tubulipora radicata 
Tubulipora rarofasciculata 
Tubulipora samuelsoni 
Tubulipora serpens 
Tubulipora similis 
Tubulipora simplex 
Tubulipora smitti 
Tubulipora soluta 
Tubulipora spatiosa 
Tubulipora stellata 
Tubulipora subdisticha 
Tubulipora suberecta 
Tubulipora tenuis 
Tubulipora trifaria 
Tubulipora tuba 
Tubulipora tuboangusta 
Tubulipora tubolata 
Tubulipora uniformis 
Tubulipora varians 
Tubulipora ventricosa 
Tubulipora verrucosa
Tubulipora ziczac

References

Bryozoan genera